Johan Adolf Sundkvist (22 June 1889 – 16 December 1977) was a Swedish long-distance runner who competed in the 1912 Summer Olympics. He finished tenth in the individual cross country competition. This was the fifth best Swedish result, so he was not awarded with a medal in the team cross country competition, where only the best three were honored. The course was rather hilly and ca. 12 km long; it was not made known to competitors before the race.

References

1889 births
1977 deaths
Swedish male long-distance runners
Olympic athletes of Sweden
Athletes (track and field) at the 1912 Summer Olympics
Olympic cross country runners